Northwestern Province or Northwest Province  or North-Western Province may refer to:
Northwest Region, Cameroon, Northwest Region since 2008
North-West Frontier Province (1901–55), Pakistan, Khyber Pakhtunkhwa since 2010
North West (South African province),  established 1994, capital is Mahikeng
North Western Province, Sri Lanka, also known as Wayamba
North-Western Province, Zambia
North Western Province (Victoria), an electorate of the Victorian Legislative Council (Australia) from 1856 to 2006
Northwest Province (IMCRA region), an Australian marine biogeographic province
North-Western Provinces, an administrative region in British India which existed in one form or another from 1836 until 1902

Province name disambiguation pages